Donald Robert Abrahamson Jr. (born September 19, 1957) is an American weightlifter. He competed in the 1984 Summer Olympics.

He initially graduated from the University of Central Florida with a degree with computer science and worked as a software programmer for a time before turning his weightlifting career professional. 

He also won the weightlifting competitions at the 1978, 1981, and 1983 U.S. Olympic Festival, as well as winning the U.S. Nationals in 1972 and 1978.

References

1957 births
Living people
Weightlifters at the 1984 Summer Olympics
American male weightlifters
Olympic weightlifters of the United States
People from Athol, Massachusetts
Sportspeople from Worcester County, Massachusetts
20th-century American people